Fatanpur is a small village situated in the Gaura block, Raniganj tehsil, Pratapgarh district, Uttar Pradesh, India.

Location
It is 30 km east from Pratapgarh by road and 45 km north-east from Allahabad by air distance. 
It is at 25° 44' 02.89" N, 82° 07'27.51"E. 
Fatanpur is located on the Lacknow-Varansi 36 nu. Highway.

Facilities
Fatanpur has a government primary school and government middle school.

Economy
Most  people of the village depend on farming.

Temples
Budiya Mayi is famous temple of the village.

Villages in Pratapgarh district, Uttar Pradesh